Hedekas is a locality situated in Munkedal Municipality, Västra Götaland County, Sweden with 370 inhabitants in 2010.

Links 
Old pics from Hedekas

References 

Populated places in Västra Götaland County
Populated places in Munkedal Municipality